This Time I'm Swingin'! is an album recorded by Dean Martin for Capitol Records. The sessions yielding this album's songs were recorded in May 1960. While thirteen tracks were recorded during the three sessions, only twelve of them made it onto the album when it was released October 3, 1960. "Ain't That a Kick in the Head" was recorded during those sessions (May 10) but not released. The backing orchestra was conducted and arranged by Nelson Riddle. The original album consisted of twelve songs, many with prominent brass arrangements.

Track listing

LP
Capitol Records Catalog Number (S) T-1659

Capitol Records Release Number T-1442
(Monaural Copy)

Side A
"I Can't Believe That You're in Love with Me" (Clarence Gaskill, Jimmy McHugh) - 2:27
Session 9459; Master 33850. Recorded May 17, 1960.
"True Love" (Cole Porter) - 2:35
Session 9459; Master 33848. Recorded May 17, 1960.
"You're Nobody till Somebody Loves You" (Russ Morgan, Larry Stock, James Cavanaugh) - 2:15
Session 9444S, Master 33806. Recorded May 10, 1960.
"On the Street Where You Live" (Frederick Loewe, Alan Jay Lerner) - 3:43
Session 9441S, Master 33745. Recorded May 9, 1960.
"Imagination" (Johnny Burke, Jimmy Van Heusen) - 3:16
Session 9441S; Master 33747. Recorded May 9, 1960.
"(It Will Have to Do) Until the Real Thing Comes Along" (Mann Holiner, Saul Chaplin, Alberta Nichols, Sammy Cahn, L.E. Freeman) - 3:03
Session 9444S; Master 33804. Recorded May 10, 1960.

Side B
"Please Don't Talk About Me When I'm Gone" (Sam H. Stept, Sidney Clare, Bee Palmer) - 2:26
Session 9444S; Master 33805. Recorded May 10, 1960.
"I've Grown Accustomed to Her Face" (Loewe, Lerner) - 2:44
Session 9441S; Master 33746. Recorded May 9, 1960.
"Someday (You'll Want Me to Want You)" (Jimmie Hodges) - 2:23
Session 9441S; Master 33744. Recorded May 9, 1960.
"Mean to Me" (Roy Turk, Fred Ahlert) - 2:11
Session 9444S; Master 33808. Recorded May 10, 1960.
"Heaven Can Wait" (Eddie DeLange, Van Heusen) - 2:31
Session 9459; Master 33849. Recorded May 17, 1960.
"Just in Time" (Jule Styne, Betty Comden, Adolph Green) - 2:16
Session 9459; Master 33847. Recorded May 17, 1960.

Compact disc
1997 EMI/Capitol combined This Time I'm Swingin! with Pretty Baby (from 1957). Catalog Number 7243 8 54546 2 9. (in MONO !)

2005 Collectors' Choice Music reissue added four more tracks to the twelve tracks on the original Capitol LP. Catalog Number WWCCM06052. (STEREO - Bonustracks in MONO)
"My Own, My Only, My All" (Jay Livingston, Ray Evans) - 3:00
Session 1364A; Master 4520-2. Recorded June 20, 1949.
"Bonne Nuit (Goodnight)" (Jay Livingston, Evans) - 2:41
Session 2108; Master 7327-9. Recorded April 9, 1951.
"You and Your Beautiful Eyes" (Mack David, Jerry Livingston) - 2:08
Session 1992; Master 6889-15. Recorded December 2, 1950.
"Choo'N Gum" (Vic Mizzy, Mann Curtis) - 2:26
Session 1693; Master 5699-2. Recorded March 28, 1950.

Personnel
Dean Martin: vocals
Nelson Riddle: leader
Emanuel 'Mannie' Klein: contractor (Session 9441S)
Sol Klein: contractor (Sessions 9444S and 9459)
Alton R. 'Al' Hendrickson: guitar
Joseph G. 'Joe' Comfort: bass
Irving Cottler: drums (Session 9441S)
Alvin A. Stoller: drums (Sessions 9444S and 9459)
William Miller: piano
Jacques Gasselin: cello (Session 9459)
Edgar 'Ed' Lustgarten: cello
Eleanor Aller Slatkin: cello
Alvin Dinkin: viola (Sessions 9444S and 9459)
Stanley Harris: viola (Session 9441S)
Paul Robyn: viola
Victor Arno: violin (Session 9459)
Victor Bay: violin
Alex Beller: violin
Harry Bluestone: violin (Session 9441S)
Jacques Gasselin: violin (Session 9441S)
Daniel 'Dan' Lube: violin
Marshall Sosson: violin (Session 9444S and 9459)
Felix Slatkin: violin (Session 9444S)
Gerald Vinci: violin (Sessions 9441S and 9444S)
William M. 'Buddy' Collette: saxophone
John 'Plas' Johnson, Jr.: saxophone
Harry G. Klee: saxophone
Joseph J. Koch: saxophone
Ronald 'Ronnie Lang' Langinger: saxophone (Session 9441S)
Wilbur Schwartz: saxophone (Sessions 9444S and 9459)
Russell Brown: trombone
Richard L. 'Dick' Noel: trombone
Thomas 'Tom' Pederson: trombone (Sessions 9441S and 9444S)
Thomas Shepard: trombone
Walter P. 'Pete' Candoli: trumpet
Donald A. Fagerquist: trumpet (Session 9441S)
Conrad Gozzo: trumpet (Session 9444S)
Dale McMickle: trumpet (Session 9459)
Carroll Lewis: trumpet
Clarence F. 'Shorty' Sherock: trumpet

Notes

Dean Martin albums
1960 albums
Capitol Records albums
Albums arranged by Nelson Riddle
Albums conducted by Nelson Riddle